Kofi Iddie Adams (born 2 May 1975) is a Ghanaian politician who is a member of the National Democratic Congress. He is the member of Parliament for the Buem Constituency in the Oti region. He is a former National Organizer for the National Democratic Congress.

Early life and education 
Kofi Iddie Adams was born on 2 May 1975. He comes from Teteman, a town in the Jasikan District in the Oti Region of Ghana. He holds a Bachelor of Science degree in Zoology with emphasis on Epidemiology of Parasitic Diseases.

Career 
Adams served as a tutor at Adisadel College. He later served as the Spokesperson And Director Of Public Affairs for Flt Lt. Jerry John Rawlings (Rtd), a former President Of Ghana.

Politics 
Adams has served as deputy General Secretary in the past for the National Democratic Congress. In December 2014, he was elected as National Organizer for the party in the National Executive elections. In the run off to the 2016 elections, he was selected as the campaign coordinator of the NDC's 15-member national campaign team, along with people like Joyce Bawah Mogtari, Felix Kwakye Ofosu, Daniel Ohene Agyekum, Dan Abodakpi, Samuel Ofosu-Ampofo all serving as members and Johnson Asiedu Nketia as chairman.

Parliamentary bid 
Adams won the parliamentary bid to represent the National Democratic Congress for the Buem Constituency ahead of the 2020 elections. Adams secured 388 votes to unseat incumbent member of parliament Daniel Kosi Ashaimah who polled 280 votes. The others Ibrahim Adams Muniru and Daniel Adeapena polled 95 and nine votes respectively.

In December 2020, Adams won the Buem Constituency. He won by getting 18,528 votes representing 71.84% against his closest contender Lawrence Kwami Aziale of the New Patriotic Party who had 6,843 votes representing 26.5%.

Member of parliament 
Adams was sworn into office as the Member of Parliament representing the Buem Constituency in the 8th Parliament of the 4th Republic of Ghana on 7 January 2021. He serves as a member on the Public Accounts Committee and the Defence and Interior Committee of Parliament.

Personal life 
Adams is a Christian.

References

External links 
 Kofi Adams talks about the politics in Ghana and his hopes to get into parliament
 Kofi Iddie Adams, GhanaMPs Profile

National Democratic Congress (Ghana) politicians
Living people
Ghanaian MPs 2021–2025
1975 births